Hughitt is a surname. Notable people with the surname include:

Marvin Hughitt (1837–1928), American railroad tycoon
Tommy Hughitt (1892–1961), American college football player